Veliki Brat VIP All Stars was the third season of the regional celebrity version of Veliki Brat. The show started airing on 9 March 2009, and finished on 6 April 2009. 

It was aired on three television channels in three countries: Pink in Serbia, Pink BH in Bosnia-Herzegovina, and Pink M in Montenegro.

Celebrities from Serbia, Bosnia and Herzegovina and Montenegro competed for €50,000. The hosts of the show were Milan Kalinić and Marijana Mićić.

Housemates

Review 
 Jelena Karleuša entered the Veliki Brat house as a special guest star and left after 24 hours.
 Only 3 housemates have already been in the Veliki Brat house. They are Jelena Žeželj (she was in the second season of Veliki Brat), Miki Đuričić (he was in the house in the first and in the second season of Veliki Brat) and Dragan Marinković Maca (he was in the first season of VIP Veliki Brat).
 Nenad Čanak, politician from Novi Sad, left the house on Day 9 because of his politician obligations. Čanak later refused to get back to the house.
Milić Vukašinović entered the house on Day 15. He had already been in the house in the second season of Veliki Brat VIP.
Miki had a secret task in the first week in the house. He had to nominate 5 housemates, they were Jelena Zezelj, Mira Skoric, Nenad Canak, Ivana Skoric and Sandra Draskovic. The housemates who saved Sandra, Ivana and Mira.
On the Day 15 Milan Mumin was evicted. One day later (Day 16) Big Brother surprised all the housemates by organising public nominations. Maca didn't wanted to nominate anybody, so he was nominated by Big Brother. Housemates nominated Miki and Tijana. Sandra broke the rule by talking about nominations. She was nominated by Big Brother. Sandra Drašković (Sani Armani) was evicted.
Housemates nominated Milić Vukasinović, Tijana and Kalimero. Kalimero received the most votes for eviction on forums. On the second place was Tijana and the fewest votes had Milić. On Monday night Milić was evicted.
 Big Brother organised unexpected nominations. Housemates nominated Gru, Tijana and Kalimero. One of them would be evicted on next Friday. Kalimero was evicted.
 There are 8 remaining housemates who became finalists. They are: Filip, Tijana, Maca, Mia, Miki, Ivana, Gru and Mira.
On the semifinal night Mia received the fewest votes to win, therefore evicted. At the same time Ivana was evicted too. An hour after, Tijana was evicted. Mira, Gru, Miki, Maca and Filip were the last in the house.

Nominations table

Miki was immune as he is the current Head of House and was the only housemate allowed to nominate. Next the remaining housemates voted to save 3 of the potential nominees. As there was a tie, a second round of voting took place between the tied housemates. Maca was not required to vote in the 2nd round as the result was no longer in doubt.
 Maca refused to nominate and was automatically nominated by Veliki Brat. Sani was automatically nominated by Veliki Brat as punishment for discussing nominations

2009 Serbian television seasons
03